The triathlon competition at the 2014 Central American and Caribbean Games was held in Veracruz, Mexico.

The tournament was scheduled to be held from 15–16 November at John Sparks Boulevard.

Medal summary

Medal table

References

External links
Official Website

2014 Central American and Caribbean Games events
2014 in triathlon
Central American and Caribbean Games